Rashomon aka Lover’s Puzzle is the seventh Mandarin studio album of Taiwanese Mandopop artist Show Lo . It was released on 15 January 2010 by Gold Typhoon (Taiwan).

The album was available on pre-order and three editions were released including the Rashomon (Dance Without Limits 3D MV Collectible Edition) (羅生門 舞法舞天3D影音典藏版) (CD+DVD). It includes a new song "舞法舞天" (Dance Without Limits) and 3D music video of the song, which was the theme song for 2010 Show Lo (Dance Without Limits 3D World Live) World Tour Concert.

Album
The album's lead track "愛的主場秀" (The Leading Role) is Luo's trademark dance track, for which the music video was filmed at the historic United Palace Theater, New York. The second lead track "習慣就好" (I'll Get Used To It) is in the style of a rock ballad, as well as "為什麼要在一起" (Why Were We Together) which has a jazz feel.

The tracks "愛瘋頭" (Head Over Heels) is the opening theme song; "生理時鐘" (Body Clock), "愛不單行" (You Won't Be Alone) and "In Your Eyes" featuring Rainie Yang (previously included in her fifth studio album Rainie & Love...?) are insert songs of Taiwanese drama Hi My Sweetheart, starring Luo and Yang.

Reception
The album debuted at number one on Taiwan's G-Music Weekly Mandarin and Combo Charts, and Five Music Chart at week 3 (15 to 21 January 2010) with a percentage sales of 38.96%, 25.19% and 55.72% respectively. It peaked at number one continuously for 10 weeks on all 3 charts and charted on the Mandarin and Combo Charts for 16 weeks and Five Music Chart for 17 weeks.

The tracks "愛的主場秀" (The Leading Role), "愛不單行" (You Won't Be Alone) and "舞法舞天" (Dance Without Limits) are listed at number 6, 40 and 57 respectively on Hit Fm Taiwan's Hit Fm Annual Top 100 Singles Chart (Hit-Fm年度百首單曲) for 2010.

The album was awarded one of the Top 10 Selling Mandarin Albums of the Year at the 2010 IFPI Hong Kong Album Sales Awards, presented by the Hong Kong branch of IFPI. On 13 December 2010, the album was certificated by Recording Industry Foundation in Taiwan (RIT) for sales of 154,218 copies in Taiwan, for audit period of 15 January to 30 September 2010, thus a certification of five platinums and the best selling album in Taiwan of 2010.

Track listing

Music videos

Releases
Three editions (excludes pre-order editions) were released by Gold Typhoon (Taiwan):
 15 January 2010 - Rashomon (Preorder Edition) (CD) - includes gifts.
 15 January 2010 - Rashomon (CD)
 12 February 2010 - Rashomon (Love Doesn't Travel Alone Celebration Edition) (CD+DVD) (羅生門 愛不單行冠軍慶功版) (CD+DVD) - includes gifts.
 12 March 2010 - Rashomon (Dance Without Limits 3D MV Collectible Edition) (羅生門 舞法舞天3D影音典藏版) (CD+DVD) - includes a new song and 6 MVs:
 "舞法舞天" (Dance Without Limits) - theme song of 2010 Show Lo (Dance Without Limits 3D World Live) World Tour Concert
 "舞法舞天" 3D立體紅藍版 (Dance Without Limits) 3D MV - 4:32
 "舞法舞天" 2D版 (Dance Without Limits) 2D MV - 4:19
 "愛的主場秀" (The Leading Role) MV  - 4:36
 "習慣就好" (I'll Get Used To It) MV  - 4:16
 "愛瘋頭" (Head Over Heels) MV  - 4:14
 "愛不單行" (Love Doesn't Travel Alone) MV  - 4:39

Charts

References

External links
  Show Lo@Gold Typhoon Taiwan

2010 albums
Show Lo albums
Gold Typhoon Taiwan albums